Nikolay Vasilyevich Pankov (born January 5, 1965) is a Russian political figure and a deputy of the 5th, 6th, 7th, and 8th State Dumas. In 2008, he was granted Candidate of Sciences in Economics degree. 

In 1994, Pankov started working in the Saratov Oblast Duma as a consultant of the secretariat of the chairman of the regional parliament. In 1996, he started working in the administration of the Saratov Oblast. From 2001 to 2005, he was the assistant and then head of the secretariat of the Deputy Chairman of the State Duma of the Russian Federation Vyacheslav Volodin. In October 2005, he was elected deputy of the Saratov Oblast Duma of the 4th convocation. In 2007, he was elected deputy of the 5th State Duma. In 2011, 2016, and 2021, Pankov was re-elected as deputy of the  6th, 7th, and 8th State Dumas, respectively.

Awards  
 Order of Honour (Russia)
 Order "For Merit to the Fatherland"

References

1965 births
Living people
People from Nizhny Novgorod Oblast
United Russia politicians
Fifth convocation members of the State Duma (Russian Federation)
Sixth convocation members of the State Duma (Russian Federation)
Seventh convocation members of the State Duma (Russian Federation)
Eighth convocation members of the State Duma (Russian Federation)